Luka Marino Odak (born 22 November 1989) is a Croatian-German footballer who plays as a right-back for FC Pipinsried.

Career

Odak began his career in Bayern Munich's youth team before being released in 2007, and having spells with MSV Duisburg and FC Ingolstadt 04, playing for both clubs' reserve teams. In 2012, he returned to Munich to sign for SpVgg Unterhaching, and made his 3. Liga debut in a 2–0 win over SV Wehen Wiesbaden, as a substitute for Marcel Kappelmaier. A year later he moved to Rot-Weiß Erfurt.

References

External links

Luka Odak at FuPa

1989 births
Living people
German people of Croatian descent
German footballers
MSV Duisburg players
FC Ingolstadt 04 players
FC Ingolstadt 04 II players
SpVgg Unterhaching players
FC Rot-Weiß Erfurt players
Türkgücü München players
FC Pipinsried players
3. Liga players
Regionalliga players
Association football fullbacks
Footballers from Frankfurt